Pellaea is a genus of ferns in the Cheilanthoideae subfamily of the Pteridaceae. The genus name is derived from the Greek word πελλος (pellos), meaning "dark," and refers to the brown stems.  Many members of the genus are commonly known as cliffbrakes. They primarily grow in rocky habitats, including moist rocky canyons, slopes, and bluffs.

Distribution
Ferns in this genus are most abundant and diverse in the southwestern United States south into Andean South America, central and southern Africa, and eastern Australia to New Zealand.

Description
These ferns typically have creeping rhizomes and pinnately to bipinnately compound leaves lacking prominent scales or trichomes on the blades. Like most members of Pteridaceae, they have marginal sori protected by a false indusium formed from the reflexed leaf margin.

The distinction of Pellaea from the typically hairier or scalier Cheilanthes has proven difficult, with some members being of uncertain affinity, listed by different authors in both genera. Furthermore, Pellaea contains a number of sections that may warrant generic status since they appear to represent convergence in phenotypes related to arid habitats rather than similarity due to common descent. These sections are:

 Pellaea section Pellaea: includes most American members of the genus as well as a single African member (P. rufa);
 Pellaea section Platyloma: includes the Australian and New Zealand species;
 Pellaea section Holcochlaena: includes the African species.

The genus Ormopteris, long combined with Pellaea as a section, was recognized as a separate genus again in 2015.

Most members of the genus are not generally used for any commercial purpose, although several species (most notably P. rotundifolia and P. falcata of section Platyloma) are cultivated as indoor plants.

Species
, the Checklist of Ferns and Lycophytes of the World recognized the following species:

 (Colombia)
 – coffee cliffbrake (USA, Mexico) 
 (Angola)
 (Southeast Africa) 
 – purple-stem cliffbrake (USA, Canada, Mexico, Guatemala)
 (Southeast Africa, Sri Lanka, South India)
 – Sierra cliffbrake (USA)
 – Brewer's cliffbrake (USA)
 – Bridges' cliffbrake (USA)
 – hot rock fern (New Zealand, Australia)
 (Spain, Africa, China, North India, Pakistan, Nepal)
 – heart-leaved cliffbrake (USA, Mexico)
 (Africa)
 (Africa)
 – sickle fern (Australia, New Zealand, South India, Sri Lanka, Southeast Asia, New Caledonia)
 – Gastony's cliffbrake (USA, Cananda)
 – smooth cliffbrake (USA, Canada)
 – P. bridgesii × P. mucronata (USA)
 (Argentina, Chile)
 – Intermediate cliffbrake (USA, Mexico)
 (South Africa)
 (DR Congo, East Africa, South India)
 – Lyngholm's cliffbrake (USA)
 – birdfoot cliffbrake (USA)
 (Australia)
 (Chile)
 – dwarf sickle fern (Australia)
 (Mexico)
 (Mexico)
 – ovate-leaved cliffbrake (USA, Mexico, northwest South America)
 (Australia)
 (Central Africa, Southeast Africa)
 (Mexico)
 (R Congo)
 (South Africa)
 (Brazil)
 (Australia)
 (Mexico)
 – button fern (New Zealand)
 (South Africa)
 (USA, Guatemala, Mexico, Andean states)
 (Kenya, Tanzania)
 (Madagascar)
 Ternate-leaved cliffbrake (USA, Mexico, Central America, western South America, Hispaniola)
 (Southeast Asia)
 (Madagascar)
 (Madagascar)
 – spiny cliffbrake (USA, Mexico)
 (USA, Mexico)
 – green cliffbrake (Africa, Yemen, India, Pacific Islands)
 Wright's cliffbrake (USA, Mexico)
 (USA)

References

External links
 USDA PLANTS Profile

 
Fern genera